Periyasamy is a common Indian name. It may refer to

Politicians 
N. Periasamy, former Tuticorin MLA
N. K. K. Periasamy, former Erode MLA
V. Periasamy, former Anthiyur MLA
M. P. Periaswami, former Namakkal MLA
I. Periyasamy, Tamil Nadu minister for Revenue and Housing.